Shaanxijapyx is a genus of diplurans in the family Japygidae.

Species
 Shaanxijapyx xianensis Chou, in Chou & Chen 1983

References

Diplura